Kathryn Alexander (born 1955) is a Guggenheim Award-winning American composer and a professor of composition at Yale University.

Early life and education 
Alexander was born in Texas and was involved with music from an early age. She earned a bachelor's degree at Baylor University studying flute with Helen Ann Shanley, and went on to the Cleveland Institute of Music to study with Maurice Sharp. While at Cleveland, she began to compose. She sought guidance from Cleveland faculty Donald Erb and Eugene O'Brien, and went on to earn a DMA in composition at the Eastman School of Music, working with Samuel Adler, Barbara Kolb, Allan Schindler, and Joseph Schwantner. While at Eastman, she became one of the first women to teach in the Eastman Computer Music Center (now the Eastman Audio Research Studio). She pursued additional study with Leon Kirchner at the Tanglewood Music Center.

Career 
Alexander serves on the faculty of the Department of Music at Yale University, where she has taught composition and music technology since 1996. She is the founding director of the Yale Music and Technology Lab (YaleMusT). She previously taught at the Oberlin Conservatory of Music, Dartmouth College, and the University of Oregon. An influential pedagogue, she has trained prominent rising composers such as Timo Andres and Wilbert Roget, II.

She composes both acoustic and electroacoustic music, for instrumental forces ranging from chamber ensemble to solo voice and orchestra to multimedia works. Her ensemble works have been performed by the JACK Quartet, the New York New Music Ensemble, the Argento Ensemble, the Blue Elm Trio, the Deering Estate Chamber Ensemble, Fifth House Ensemble, the NOW Ensemble, Williams Chamber Players, the Yale Camerata, and the Yale Percussion Group.

She co-founded contemporary music festival New Music on the Point (NMOP) in Vermont with Jenny Beck in 2011.

Awards and recognition 
In 2018, Alexander won an Arts and Letters Award in Music from the American Academy of Arts and Letters. She is the recipient of a 2007-08 Aaron Copland Award and a 2006 Guggenheim Fellowship. In 2009, she won the Roger Sessions Memorial Bogliasco Fellowship in Music and resided as Composer-in-Residence at the Liguria Study Center in Bogliasco, Italy. Other awards include a Radcliffe Fellowship at the Center for Advanced Study at Harvard University, a Computerworld Laureate Award from the Smithsonian Institution, a Composer's Fellowship from the National Endowment for the Arts, and the Rome Prize, as well as numerous ASCAP awards.

Selected musical works 
 Of Senses Steeped (2018) for carillon, premiered at the 2018 Rockefeller Chapel Carillon New Music Festival at the University of Chicago
Of Reminiscence, premiered by the JACK Quartet
 Phantasmes (2017) for carillon and digital simulation of the Tsar Bell, composed for the University of Michigan Bicentennial Fall Festival
 Wanderers (2016) for solo double bass and chamber players, commissioned by the Fromm Music Foundation
 The Harbingers of Light (2012) for electronics, created with Juraj Kojs, Margaret Lancaster, and Jennifer Beattie
 AroundAbout (2007), for piano trio
Totally Raw I (2006-2007), spectrally-generated sonic electronica
 In The Purest Air, Sapphirine (2006), a chamber concerto for electric jazz guitar soloist, premiered by Mark Dancigers and The NOW Ensemble
 Dreams and Reveries (2005), for percussion quartet
 From The Faraway Nearby (2004), for piano trio
 ...Mania REDUX! (2003), for virtual percussionist and controllist
 In Memoriam (2003), for vocal soloists and vocal ensemble, premiered by the Yale Camerata under the direction of Marguerite Brooks, with soloists Richard Lalli and Julia Blue Raspe
Abstracted Cisms (2001), a multimedia performance piece for alternate controllers and performers based on the abstract shapes and contours in Willem de Kooning’s painting Abstract XIII
 Like Long-Drawn Echoes from Afar Converging (1994) for flute, viola, cello, piano, and percussion. Commissioned by the Fromm Music Foundation and premiered by the California EAR Unit at the Los Angeles County Museum of Art

References 

1955 births
Living people
20th-century American composers
21st-century American composers
Academics from Texas
American classical composers
American women classical composers
Baylor University alumni
Cleveland Institute of Music alumni
Composers for carillon
Eastman School of Music alumni
Electroacoustic music composers
Pupils of Joseph Schwantner
Pupils of Leon Kirchner
Pupils of Samuel Adler (composer)
Yale University faculty
20th-century American women musicians
20th-century American musicians
American women academics
21st-century American women